Whitehouse Primary School is a primary school in Newtownabbey. It was destroyed in an arson attack on 18 July 2009. After the school was destroyed, its students were temporarily housed in nearby Newtownabby High School. On 14 May 2010, Education Minister Caitríona Ruane approved an amount of £3.6m for rebuilding the school.

In the arson attack, the entire building except for the front half was burnt down. The front half included the canteen, the Primary (Grade) 1 Classrooms and the Nursery Unit.

Principal David McConkey wanted the school to be rebuilt, but Education Minister Caitríona Ruane was against this. After Ruane decided to shelve the plans for rebuilding the school, McConkey and others led a campaign to get the school rebuilt with the ensuing debate receiving significant media coverage. Pupils protested with signs saying "We Love Whitehouse", "We need a school to learn in", "Why No school?", "WPS Betrayed by Ruane" and "New School Now". On 14 May 2010, the Education Minister approved £3.6m for rebuilding the school. In 2011, David McConkey was awarded the MBE for his services to education.

School colours are Red, Green and White. There is also a new logo for the school, which reads "Whitehouse Primary School Learning to live". The old one simply said "Whitehouse P.S."

References 

Primary schools in County Antrim
School buildings in the United Kingdom destroyed by arson
Newtownabbey